The 1975–76 Algerian Cup is the 14th edition of the Algerian Cup. MC Oran are the defending champions, having beaten MO Constantine 2–0 in the previous season's final.

Round of 64

Round of 32

Round of 16

Quarter-finals

Semi-finals

Final

Match

References

Algerian Cup
Algerian Cup
Algerian Cup